Within the Pacific Ocean, the name of any significant tropical cyclone can be retired from the tropical cyclone naming lists by the World Meteorological Organization if it is felt that a storm is so deadly or damaging that the future use of its name would be inappropriate. Storm names can also be retired for other reasons, such as being very similar to another retired name or because it might suggest an undesirable meaning in another language. Within the Eastern and Central Pacific basins, a total of eighteen names have been removed from the official lists. Patricia was the most recent Pacific tropical cyclone to have its name retired, due to its exceptional intensity.

Background

In 1950 a tropical cyclone that affected Hawaii was named Able, after a tropical cyclone had not affected Hawaii for a number of years. The system subsequently became widely known as Hurricane Hiki, since Hiki is Hawaiian for Able. Typhoons Olive and Della of 1952 and 1957, respectively, developed within the Central Pacific, but were not named until they had crossed the International Dateline and moved into the Western Pacific basin. During 1957, two other tropical cyclones developed in the Central Pacific and were named Kanoa and Nina by the Hawaiian military meteorological offices. It was subsequently decided that future tropical cyclones would be named by borrowing names from the Western Pacific naming lists.

Within the Eastern Pacific basin the naming of tropical cyclones started in 1960, with four sets of female names initially designed to be used consecutively before being repeated. In 1965 after two lists of names had been used, it was decided to return to the top of the second list and to start recycling the sets of names on an annual basis. In 1977 after protests by various women's rights groups, NOAA made the decision to relinquish control over the name selection by allowing a regional committee of the WMO to select new sets of names. The WMO selected six lists of names which contained male names and rotated every six years. They also decided that the new lists of hurricane name would start to be used in 1978 which was a year earlier than the Atlantic. Since 1978 the same lists of names have been used, with names of significant tropical cyclones removed from the lists and replaced with new names.

During 1979, after ten names had been borrowed from the Western Pacific naming lists, Hawaiian names were reinstated for tropical cyclones developing into tropical storms forming in the Central Pacific. Five sets of Hawaiian names, using only the 12 letters of the Hawaiian alphabet, were drafted with the intent being to use the sets of names on an annual rotation basis. However, after no storms had developed in this region between 1979 and 1981, the annual lists were scrapped and replaced with four sets of names and designed to be used consecutively. Ahead of the 2007 hurricane season, the Central Pacific Hurricane Center (CPHC) and the Hawaii State Civil Defense requested that the hurricane committee retire eleven names from the Eastern Pacific naming lists. However, the committee declined the request and noted that its criteria for the retirement of names was "well defined and very strict." It was felt that while the systems may have had a significant impact on the Hawaiian Islands, none of the impacts were major enough to warrant the retirement of the names. It was also noted that the Committee had previously not retired names for systems that had a greater impact than those that had been submitted. The CPHC also introduced a revised set of Hawaiian names for the Central Pacific, after they had worked with the University of Hawaii Hawaiian Studies Department to ensure the correct meaning and appropriate historical and cultural use of the names.

The practice of retiring significant names was started during 1955 by the United States Weather Bureau in the Atlantic basin, after hurricanes Carol, Edna, and Hazel struck the Northeastern United States and caused a significant amount of damage in the previous year. Initially the names were only designed to be retired for ten years after which they might be reintroduced, however, it was decided at the 1969 Interdepartmental hurricane conference that any significant hurricane in the future would have its name permanently retired. Several names have been removed from the Pacific naming lists for various reasons other than for causing a significant amount of death/destruction, which include being pronounced in a very similar way to other names and for political reasons.

Names retired in the Eastern Pacific basin

Within the Eastern Pacific basin – between the western coasts of the Americas and 140°W – fifteen names have been retired since naming started in the region in 1960. Prior to the start of the modern naming lists in 1978, the names Hazel and Adele were retired from the list of names for reasons that are not clear. The name Fico was subsequently retired after the system had affected Hawaii in 1978, while the name Knut was removed after being used in 1987 for unknown reasons having barely reaching tropical storm strength. In 1989 the name Iva was removed as it was pronounced very similarly to Iwa, which was retired from the Central Pacific lists of names in 1982 after affecting Hawaii. In the early 1990s the names Fefa and Ismael were both retired after they affected Hawaii and Northern Mexico, respectively. Hurricane Pauline became the deadliest Eastern Pacific hurricane, and its name was retired after it affected Mexico in 1997.

Political considerations prompted retirement of the name Adolph and removal of the name Israel at the start of the 2001 season, after controversy arose over their use. The name Kenna was retired in 2003 after it became one of the most intense Pacific hurricanes ever recorded. The name Alma was retired in 2009 after it had become the first Eastern Pacific tropical cyclone on record to make landfall along the Pacific Coast of Central America. The name Manuel was retired in 2013, after it became the first Eastern Pacific tropical cyclone on record to make landfall in mainland Mexico, redevelop over water, and become a hurricane. At the 2015 hurricane committee meeting the name Odile was retired from the list of names after it became the first major hurricane to affect Baja California in 25 years. At that same meeting, the name Isis—last used during the 2004 season—was preemptively removed from the list of names for 2016; it was deemed inappropriate to be used because of the Islamic extremist militant group which was then called by the same name.

Names retired in the Central Pacific basin
Within the Central Pacific basin—between 140°W and the International Date Line at 180°—four names have been retired since the introduction of the modern naming list for the basin in 1979. Hurricanes Iwa and Iniki were retired after impacting Hawaii, while Paka and Ioke were retired after the affecting various islands in Micronesia.

See also
 List of Pacific hurricanes
 List of retired Atlantic hurricane names
 List of retired Pacific typhoon names
 List of retired Philippine typhoon names
 List of retired Australian cyclone names
 List of retired South Pacific tropical cyclone names

Notes

References

External links
 National Hurricane Center's Post-Season Reports
 Unisys Weather archives for the Eastern Pacific

 
Names Pacific hurricane retired

fr:Liste des noms retirés d'ouragans